Jenny Pearce is the Professor of Young People and Public Policy at the University of Bedfordshire. Her research interests include the investigation of child sexual exploitation. She was a member of the original panel of the Independent Panel Inquiry into Child Sexual Abuse prior to the inquiry's reconstitution in January 2015. She is an Officer of the Order of the British Empire. Bedfordshire University  has been awarded the Queen's Anniversary Prize for applied research on child sexual exploitation influencing new safeguarding policy and practice that she has led in her role as director of The International Centre, researching child sexual exploitation, violence and trafficking.

References

External links

Year of birth missing (living people)
Living people
Academics of the University of Bedfordshire
Officers of the Order of the British Empire
British women academics
British sociologists